Llantwit Fardre was a station on the Llantrisant and Taff Vale Junction Railway.

The station consisted of a single platform and station buildings. A small bridge crossed over Crown Hill to the west of the station followed by the Dyffryn Red Ash Colliery sidings and a spur to Cwm Colliery. There were numerous tramways for coal workings in this area. One of the sidings consisted of a weigh bridge. To the west of the station existed sidings for the Dyffryn Red Ash Colliery.

Modern day
No trace of the railway station and track exist anymore. The railway bridge to the west on Crown Hill of the station was removed in the 1990s. The Dyffryn Red Ash Colliery sidings have now been built upon and no traces of the tramways exist.

References 

Disused railway stations in Rhondda Cynon Taf
Former Taff Vale Railway stations
Railway stations in Great Britain opened in 1875
Railway stations in Great Britain closed in 1952